George Washington Case (November 11, 1915 – January 23, 1989) was an American left and right fielder in Major League Baseball who played most of his career for the Washington Senators. Possibly the sport's fastest player between the 1920s and 1950s, he is the only player to lead the major leagues in stolen bases five consecutive times (–), and his six overall league titles tied Ty Cobb's American League record; that mark was later broken by Luis Aparicio. His 349 career steals ranked ninth in AL history at the end of his career, and were the most by any player from 1930 to 1960; his 321 steals with the Senators were the third most in Washington history.

Born in Trenton, New Jersey, Case attended Trenton Central High School and then the Peddie School in Hightstown, from which he graduated in 1936. He made his first appearance with the Senators in September , and in his  rookie season batted .305. In 1939 he batted .302, led the Senators with 103 runs, and topped the league for the first time with 51 steals, also earning the first of four All-Star selections. In  he posted career highs in runs (109), hits (192) and runs batted in (56) while recording 35 steals. In 1943 he won his fifth straight title with 61 stolen bases, equalling the highest total in the major leagues between 1921 and 1961; he also led the AL with 102 runs, with a personal best of 36 doubles and a .294 average, as the Senators enjoyed their first winning season since 1936, finishing second in the AL to the New York Yankees.  saw him slip to a .250 average and only 63 runs, though he finished second to Snuffy Stirnweiss in the AL with 49 steals.  saw him again finish second to Stirnweiss with 30 steals as he raised his average to .294; the Senators again finished second, only a game and a half behind the Detroit Tigers, and Case earned his last All-Star selection (though the game was cancelled due to war restrictions) and finished ninth in the MVP voting.

In December 1945, he was traded to the Cleveland Indians for Jeff Heath; in  he won his last stolen base title with 28, though he only batted .225 with just 46 runs. During that season, new Indians owner Bill Veeck staged one of his famous promotions, matching Case against Jesse Owens in a 100-yard race which Owens won. In March  Case was traded back to the Senators, and after hitting for a .150 average in 36 games he retired due to spinal problems which had plagued him throughout his career. Over his 11-year career he batted .282 with 785 runs, 1,415 hits, 21 home runs and 377 RBI in 1,226 games played. His 321 steals with the Senators placed him behind only Clyde Milan (495) and Sam Rice (346) in Washington history. He surpassed the .300 mark three times in the majors.

In retirement, Case opened a sporting goods store in Trenton, and also coached at Rutgers from 1950 to 1960, winning the school's only College World Series berth in his first year. He later coached for the expansion Senators from 1961–63, and for the Minnesota Twins (the relocated original Senators) in 1968; he also managed in the Pacific Coast League for two seasons in the 1960s. In 1969 he became a minor league instructor for the Yankees, and later had the same position with the Seattle Mariners. He died of emphysema at age 73 in Trenton.

See also
List of Major League Baseball career stolen bases leaders
List of Major League Baseball annual runs scored leaders
List of Major League Baseball annual stolen base leaders
Major League Baseball titles leaders

References

Sources

1915 births
1989 deaths
American League All-Stars
American League stolen base champions
Baseball players from Trenton, New Jersey
Cleveland Indians players
Deaths from emphysema
Hawaii Islanders managers
Major League Baseball left fielders
Major League Baseball right fielders
Major League Baseball third base coaches
Minnesota Twins coaches
Washington Senators (1901–1960) players
Washington Senators (1961–1971) coaches
Washington Senators (1961–1971) scouts
Minor league baseball managers
Peddie School alumni
Rutgers Scarlet Knights baseball coaches
Trenton Central High School alumni
Trenton Senators players
York White Roses players
Baseball coaches from New Jersey